Jonathan David Coleman (born 23 September 1966) is a retired New Zealand politician and medical practitioner, who most recently served as Minister of Health and for Sport and Recreation under the Fifth National Government. Coleman also served as Minister of Defence and Immigration within the first two terms of that government, and represented the parliamentary constituency Northcote for the National Party from 2005 to 2018. 

Coleman trained in medicine at the University of Auckland before acquiring an MBA from the London Business School in the United Kingdom. In the 2005 election, Coleman stood as the National Party's candidate for the Northcote seat, defeating Ann Hartley of the Labour Party in what was the only Labour seat to flip to National in the entire election. He came a cabinet minister upon John Key leading the party to victory in 2008. A member of National's right-wing faction, Coleman has espoused socially conservative views, notably opposing gay marriage and free reassignment healthcare for transgender people. He oversaw austerity as Health Minister, including multiple budget cuts across the medical sector. These were controversial to the point in which a motion of no confidence was almost tabled in him by members of the Southern District Health Board in 2015.

Coleman announced his intention to seek the National Party leadership in 2016 after John Key announced his intention to resign, but withdrew, allowing Bill English to succeed as Prime Minister unopposed.

Early years
After attending Auckland Grammar School where he was Head Prefect in 1984, Coleman trained as a doctor, graduating from University of Auckland's medical school. He worked as a doctor in New Zealand, the United Kingdom, and Australia (in the latter case, for the Royal Flying Doctor Service). He later obtained an MBA from London Business School in 2000, and returned to New Zealand the following year. 

He worked for PricewaterhouseCoopers as consultant on health sector issues and as a part-time general practitioner in Otara. He entered the selection for the National Party candidacy for Tamaki but was defeated by Allan Peachey before successfully contesting the candidacy for Northcote.

He has a 170-year family connection to his Northcote electorate. He has also claimed to have “a bit of tangata whenua thrown in to [his] bloodline”, but he has never shown evidence of having Māori whakapapa, nor affiliated himself to any iwi.

Member of Parliament

In the 2005 election, Coleman stood as the National Party's candidate for the Northcote seat. He was also ranked 35th on the party's list. Coleman was successful, defeating Ann Hartley of the Labour Party. This was the only Auckland seat to change hands between Labour and National in the 2005 election.

In 2006, Coleman (then the National Party's associate health spokesman) caused controversy when he accepted British American Tobacco's – an active lobbier on health sector issues – offer of sitting in their corporate box during a U2 concert. It was alleged he blew cigar smoke at a woman during the concert. Coleman admitted he made a mistake by sitting in British American Tobacco's corporate box and smoking at a U2 concert.

In the  Coleman was re-elected in Northcote with a majority of 9,360 votes.

2011–14
After being re-elected for a third term for the Northcote seat in November 2011, Coleman was promoted in Cabinet to Minister of Defence, Minister of State Services and Associate Minister of Finance.

In 2012, Coleman made a secret visit to Afghanistan to visit New Zealand troops. Coleman said the visit was a "chance for him to offer his support to the troops for the important work they were doing providing security in the province".

As Minister of Defence, Coleman led the implementation of the 2010 Defence White Paper. He commissioned the Defence Mid-Point Rebalancing Review which set out the long term approach, balancing funding, capabilities and policy. Coleman oversaw the NZDF's successful withdrawal from its three largest missions in Afghanistan, Solomon Islands and Timor-Leste.

Coleman voted against the Marriage (Definition of Marriage) Amendment Act 2013.

2014–18
In 2014 Coleman became the first doctor in 70 years to take the health portfolio. In May 2015, Coleman described the Young Labour's proposal for free gender reassignment surgery for transgender people in New Zealand as a "nutty idea".

On 20 May 2015, a meeting in Alexandra organised by Central Otago Health Services Ltd supported a vote of no confidence in Health Minister Jonathan Coleman. When Russell Garbutt moved a motion of no confidence in the minister and emailed him the following morning, he did not expect Coleman to pick up the phone and call [him]. They spoke for more than 10 minutes, with Coleman telling Mr Garbutt the Southern District Health Board (SDHB) was his ''number 1'' priority in respect of its budget woes.

Leadership campaign
Coleman announced his intention to seek the National Party leadership in 2016 after John Key announced his intention to resign. He was unsuccessful, with Bill English becoming the new PM.

Resignation
On 22 March 2018, Coleman announced he would resign from Parliament, thereby triggering the 2018 Northcote by-election.

References

External links

 
 Profile at National Party website
 

|-

|-

|-

|-

|-

1966 births
Government ministers of New Zealand
Living people
Members of the Cabinet of New Zealand
Members of the New Zealand House of Representatives
New Zealand MPs for Auckland electorates
New Zealand National Party MPs
People educated at Auckland Grammar School
University of Auckland alumni
21st-century New Zealand politicians
Candidates in the 2017 New Zealand general election
New Zealand defence ministers